Bernd Reinhold Gerhard Heynemann (born 22 January 1954 in Magdeburg) is a former German football referee and now a German politician.

References

External links
 Official website  
 
 
 
 

1954 births
Living people
German football referees
UEFA Champions League referees
1998 FIFA World Cup referees
FIFA World Cup referees
Politicians from Magdeburg
UEFA Euro 1996 referees
Members of the Bundestag 2005–2009
Members of the Bundestag 2002–2005
Members of the Bundestag for the Christian Democratic Union of Germany
Sportspeople from Magdeburg